Community Organized Relief Effort, also known as CORE Response and formerly as J/P Haitian Relief Organization is a non-profit organization founded by actor Sean Penn and Ann Lee in response to the January 12, 2010 earthquake in Haiti. The organization was founded in 2010 and changed its name in 2019 to receive contracts and donations to work globally. In March 2020, CORE began administering free COVID-19 tests in the U.S. amid the COVID-19 pandemic.

Origins
The organization was founded by actor Sean Penn in the wake of the 2010 Haiti earthquake. J/P stood for Jenkins-Penn, a reference to Sanela Diana Jenkins, whose foundation supported initial relief efforts with Penn. Before starting the organization, Penn had never visited Haiti and did not speak French or Creole. When asked for his comment on his critics, he said he hopes they "die screaming of rectal cancer".

In 2011, Penn said that he had a lifelong commitment to Haiti, and that when he was not working he would be in the country. 
 
J/P HRO changed its name to CORE (Community Organized Relief Effort) in 2019 as it expanded its relief efforts beyond Haiti. The organization added Ann Lee as a co-founder.

Staffing
As of June 2020, CORE employs nearly 1,000 people working on COVID-19 response at 45 testing sites, including 10 mobile sites, across the United States.

In the aftermath of the 2010 earthquake in Haiti, J/P HRO employed nearly 350 people, 95 percent of whom were Haitian, to provide health, education and community development, and housing and economic opportunities.

As of 2020, CORE employs a team of over 100 people in Haiti working to rebuild communities.

Operations
CORE treated 500,000 patients at two community clinics following the earthquake, providing free emergency and primary medical care for a nominal sum. The clinics also led broad public education campaigns on good health and hygiene practice.

COVID-19
In response to the testing shortage in the United States during the COVID-19 pandemic, CORE set up and operated testing sites across the country, working in collaboration with local and state governments to open new sites as well as take over existing sites.

As of August 2020, CORE has administered more than 1.3 million free COVID-19 tests. The organization has implemented guidelines called "The Core 8" to combat the virus, which includes "delivering test results within 48 hours, a government-supported contact tracing system, food and hygiene kits along with financial aid for households with positive case results."

Site locations included Los Angeles, Oakland, Detroit, Chicago, Atlanta, New Orleans, New York, North Carolina, Navajo Nation, Napa, Bakersfield, and a "super-site" at Dodger Stadium, where up to 6,000 people are tested daily.

Tests are administered using a nasopharyngeal or oral swab via drive-through or walk-up testing. The organization is currently developing a contact tracing program as well.

Labor violations and complaints
CORE staff complained that they were forced to work 18-hour days, six days a week, without the opportunity to take breaks. Responding to the staff concerns, Penn excoriated the employees, writing in an email that "in every cell of my body is a vitriol for the way your actions reflect so harmfully upon your brothers and sisters in arms". Penn suggested that employees leave their work instead of complaining about conditions. In October 2021, the National Labor Relations Board issued a complaint that Penn and CORE violated federal labor law. According to the charge, Penn "impliedly threatened" his employees with reprisals. A 2021 California lawsuit sought civil damages, claiming that CORE failed o pay overtime and minimum wges, provide rest periods, reimburse for business expenses, provide detailed wage statements, and timely pay employees.  

In 2022, a former CORE worker who provided support during COVID relief efforts in Georgia sued CORE for unpaid wages. According to the complaint, CORE deliberately misclassified staff as contractors to avoid paying overtime. CORE's contracts require binding arbitration, which prevents a collective action by multiple employees and keeps the proceedings private.

Hurricane relief
In the years following Hurricane Matthew, CORE has participated in hurricane relief efforts in the Bahamas, Puerto Rico, the Caribbean, and the United States.

Publicity and fundraising
The Travel Channel's food show No Reservations, hosted by Anthony Bourdain, featured Haiti as the 2011 season opener which first aired on February 28, 2011. Penn and J/P HRO were featured prominently in the show including a tour of one of the IDP camps.

On January 10, 2015, Penn held his fourth annual Sean Penn & Friends Help Haiti Home fundraiser in Beverly Hills, California, which raised over $6 million for the organization. The event featured many celebrities including former United States president Bill Clinton and performances by Coldplay's Chris Martin and Red Hot Chili Peppers, who closed the event with a 30-minute set.

The proceeds from downloading and streaming of "Saved My Life", a song by Sia, co-written by Dua Lipa and performed during the online COVID Is No Joke live comedy fest hosted by Americares during the COVID-19 pandemic, benefits AmeriCares and CORE.

References

External links 
 CORE website

Charities based in California
Foreign charities operating in Haiti